The women's tournament of volleyball at the 2011 Pan American Games in Guadalajara, Mexico began on October 15 and ended on October 20, when the Brazil defeated Cuba 3–2 for the gold medal. all games were held at the Pan American Volleyball Complex. The defending champions are Cuba.

Teams

Qualification
The top seven teams in the combined FIVB and 2010 Women's Pan-American Volleyball Cup rankings plus hosts Mexico qualified for the final tournament. The following nations qualified for the tournament:

Squads

At the start of tournament, all eight participating countries had 12 players on their rosters. Final squads for the tournament are due on September 14, 2011 a month before the start of 2011 Pan American Games.

Format
 Eight teams are split into two preliminary round groups of four teams each. The top team from each group qualifies for the semifinals.
 The second placed team will play the third placed team from the other group for another place in the semifinals.
 The winning teams from the semifinals play for the gold medal. The losing teams compete for the bronze medal.

Pool standing procedure
Match won 3–0: 5 points for the winner, 0 point for the loser
Match won 3–1: 4 points for the winner, 1 points for the loser
Match won 3–2: 3 points for the winner, 2 points for the loser
In case of tie, the teams were classified according to the following criteria:
points ratio and sets ratio

Preliminary round
All times are local Central Daylight Time (UTC-5)

Group A

Group B

Final round

Championship bracket

5th–8th places bracket

Quarterfinals

Fifth to eighth place classification

Seventh place match

Fifth place match

Semifinals

Bronze medal match

Gold medal match

Final standing

Awards
MVP: 
Best Scorer: 
Best Spiker: 
Best Blocker: 
Best Server: 
Best Digger: 
Best Setter: 
Best Receiver: 
Best Libero:

Medalists

References

External links
Schedule

Volleyball at the 2011 Pan American Games
2011 in women's volleyball
Volley